John "Jack" Sullivan (August 29, 1870 – Unknown death) was a Canadian lacrosse player who competed in the 1904 Summer Olympics for the United States. Sullivan was born in Cobourg, Ontario. In 1904 he was member of the St. Louis Amateur Athletic Association which won the silver medal in the lacrosse tournament.

References

External links
 

1870 births
Year of death missing
Canadian lacrosse players
Olympic silver medalists for the United States in lacrosse
Lacrosse players at the 1904 Summer Olympics
Medalists at the 1904 Summer Olympics